Citalá is a municipality in the Chalatenango department of El Salvador. In Mayan-Ch’orti’ language its name means “the river of the stars”. As of 2013, it had a population of 4,270.

Geography
It is 47 km from Chalatenango and in the suburbs of the frontier of Honduras. It has an elevation of 788 meters over sea level and is 119 km from San Salvador.

Main sights

Church del Pilar-Citalá
The Church del Pilar-Citalá possibly built at the end of the 17th century or at the beginning of the 18th century. It is not known who built it.

Its architecture possesses a neoclassical style. The church is surrounded by an atrium that in turn is surrounded by an iron gate. Their facade has two bodies. In the inferior body, the main access in arch of half point form and other two feigned arches with ornamental elements meet. It also possesses six columns of Tuscan style inserted among the arches. This body is finished off by a triangular front which has a round crystal in the center and very marked entablatures of classic order. The superior body is decorated with half columns finished off with pinnacles and an arch of half point with two couples of columns of Tuscan style, which is in turn finished off with two pinnacles and kind of a bowl showing a cross.

The tower of the steeple is embedded to the facade and it has as ornamental elements rough columns, arches of half point, entablatures, and pinnacles, following the architectonic style of the temple. The high of the tower ends with a pointed dome. 

The church possesses colonial images and parochial documents of the 18th century. This antique population, in remote ages, gives birth to an oriental region of the country called “hueytlato” or primitive Tula.

References

El Salvador–Honduras border crossings
Municipalities of the Chalatenango Department